Cooking Guide: Can't Decide What to Eat?, released in North America as Personal Trainer: Cooking, is a digital cookbook for the Nintendo DS. The original, Japanese-language edition was released in Japan on December 4, 2008, in Europe in English on June 20, 2008, in Australia on July 3, 2008, and in North America on November 24, 2008. Cooking Guide is part of both Nintendo's Touch! Generations brand and a cooking tutorial software series started from a Japan-only title, Shaberu! DS Oryōri Navi. In North America, it is also part of the Personal Trainer series.

Gameplay
Cooking Guide is an "interactive cooking aid" that gives step by step instructions on how to cook from a range of 245 dishes. The user is guided through the preparation and cooking process via audio narration and instructional video clips, and the user can use the Nintendo DS's voice recognition to proceed through each cooking step. Users can also choose recipes based on how many calories they have, or what ingredients the user currently has at hand, among other options. Cooking Guide also keeps in memory what dishes the player has already made. The application also allows users to take notes and compile a shopping list, and features functions such as a cooking timer and a quantity calculator. As a bonus, the Game & Watch game Chef can also be played after the user unlocks it by using the timer during preparation of a recipe like in one of its predecessors Shaberu! DS Oryōri Navi. They guide the users in either English, French, Italian, Japanese, German or Spanish.

Development

Released in Japan in 2006, Cooking Guide was originally shown to the US during Nintendo's Media Briefing at the Hollywood Kodak Theatre at E3 2008. It was later shown at the Nintendo US Press Conference Live Blog in San Francisco in October 2008. After selling 600,000 units total in North America and Europe during its first two days of sales, Nintendo announced on April 27, 2009 that the game would be packaged with the latest color to be added to the DS Lite's hardware rainbow which is green. The Green-colored version of the DS lite was released on May 3, 2009.

Reception

The game was generally well-received, receiving an 81% from Metacritic. Official Nintendo Magazine felt Cooking Guide'''s features makes it "actually better than your average recipe book" and praised both the ease of use of the software and the range of recipes it offers, but felt that the European retail price it was being sold at was too steep. They gave it 80%. Pocketgamer felt that while practiced cooks will have little use for it, on the whole it was more useful than other Touch! Generations titles such as Brain Training. IGN gave Personal Trainer: Cooking a 9/10, praising its accessibility, user interface and features such as the instructional audio narration. It was awarded Best Use of Sound by IGN in their 2008 video game awards.Cooking Guide received an Excellence Prize for Entertainment at the 2006 Japan Media Arts Festival. Supermarket chain Asda has claimed that Cooking Guide has sold over 10,000 copies in the first hour of release alone, and has also positively affected the sales of products used in the application's recipes. The North American version was the 13th best-selling game and third best-selling Nintendo DS game of December 2008 in the United States.

Sequels and spin-offsCooking Guide was the first of five sequels to the Japan-only Shaberu! DS Oryōri Navi, with development split between Nintendo and Koei. Nintendo itself issued a Japan only sequel  and the North America-only 2010 release America's Test Kitchen: Let's Get Cooking, based on the PBS program, America's Test Kitchen after Cook's Illustrated magazine helped the publisher to write the game. 

 See also What's Cooking? with Jamie OliverList of Nintendo DS gamesPersonal Trainer: WalkingPersonal Trainer: Math''

Notes

References

External links 
 Official websites of United Kingdom, Australia, United States, and Japan

2008 video games
Cookbooks
Cooking video games
Indieszero games
Nintendo DS games
Nintendo DS-only games
Nintendo Entertainment Analysis and Development games
Nintendo games
Single-player video games
Touch! Generations
Video games developed in Japan
ja:しゃべる!DSお料理ナビ#世界のごはん しゃべる!DSお料理ナビ